University Athletic Association of the Philippines Swimming champions since 1938.

UAAP swimming champions

Number of championships per university
Note: The Juniors section is incomplete

See also
NCAA Philippines Swimming Championship

External links
With 4 titles, La Salle leads race for UAAP overall title (October 15, 2003)

College swimming
National swimming competitions
Swimming in the Philippines
Swimming